Figsbury Ring is an 11.2 hectare biological Site of Special Scientific Interest in Wiltshire, notified in 1975.  It is owned and managed by the National Trust.

Earthworks
Within the wider SSSI mentioned above, the earthworks of Figsbury Ring are sub-circular and enclose 6.4 hectares of grassland on a chalk ridge to the north east of Salisbury, in the parish of Firsdown, Wiltshire at NGR SU188338. It is yet to be fully investigated.

Small portions of the site were excavated in 1924 by Ben and Maud Cunnington as it was their belief that the site was the remains of an Iron Age Hill fort. Superficially this description of an earthwork with exterior ditch would seem appropriate, however the presence of an enigmatic inner ditch has led many archaeologists to doubt this interpretation. This ditch is separated from the outer rampart by a berm of up to 30 metres in width and, to many, it seems likely that the site actually began as a late neolithic Henge.

A small geophysical survey was carried out by Anthony Clark and John Gator in 1981 to determine whether or not an earth bank was ever associated with the inner ditch. The results of this survey were inconclusive.

In 1982 the finds from the Cunningtons' excavations were then reappraised by Margaret Guido and Isobel Smith. Several artefacts, notably Grooved Ware and Beaker pottery, established that there had been occupation at the site much earlier than the period proposed by the Cunningtons.

A further reappraisal of the artefacts was carried out in 2003/04 by Philip Dunn, a student at Bournemouth University. This confirmed Guido and Smith's findings and went on to identify a number of flint artefacts that were diagnostic of Neolithic occupation at the site. Following on from this study a large scale geophysical survey was conducted which covered 46% of the interior using a Fluxgate Gradiometer. The results of this survey were, again, inconclusive although no evidence was detected for the existence of an inner bank. Traces of possible structures were detected and it was proposed that the site may have particularly early origins.

When Figsbury was considered within the context of the wider landscape and a range of other nearby monuments it appeared possible that the site may have begun as a Causewayed enclosure. This may then have been modified into a Henge monument in the later Neolithic or Early Bronze Age. There is certainly sufficient evidence to state with some degree of confidence that the site was occupied (albeit temporarily or intermittently) towards the middle of the third millennium BC. Further modification of the site appears to have taken place during the late Bronze Age or early Iron Age.

In popular culture
Figsbury Ring features prominently in E. M. Forster's 1907 novel, The Longest Journey, renamed the Cadbury Rings (the surrounding area is called Cadford).  The narrator of the novel speculates as to whether the structure was British, Roman, Saxon, or Danish, and suggests it is a tomb concealing ancient dead soldiers and buried gold.  In the novel, the area between the rings is planted with mangel-wurzels and there is a tree growing in the centre of the inner ring.

References
 Natural England citation sheet for the site (accessed 31 March 2022)
 "Defining the Circle: A Multidisciplinary Evaluation of Figsbury Ring" – dissertation by Philip Dunn, submitted to Bournemouth University in 2004
 English Heritage listing of investigations

Further reading
 Collis J.  1977  "Iron Age Henges?" Archaeologia Atlantica, (2) 55–63
 
 Darvill T. & Thomas J.  2001  "Neolithic Enclosures in Atlantic Northwest Europe: Some Recent Trends". In T. Darvill & J. Thomas (Eds) Neolithic Enclosures in Atlantic Northwest Europe: Neloithic Studies Group Seminar Papers 6. Oxford: Oxbow
 Gator J.A. & Clark A.J.  1981  Figsbury Rings: Geophysical Survey Autumn 1981, report available from English Heritage: Fort Cumberland, Fort Cumberland Road, Eastney, Portsmouth, PO4 9LD
 
 Hamilton M. and Whittle A.  1999  "Grooved Ware of the Avebury Area: Styles, Contexts and Meanings". In R. Cleal & A. MacSween (Eds), Grooved Ware in Britain and Ireland.  Oxford: Oxbow, 36–47
 Harding A.F. with Lee G.E.  1987  Henge Monuments and Related Sites of Great Britain. Oxford: B.A.R.
 Oswald A., Dyer C. & Barber M.  2001  The Creation of Monuments: Neolithic Enclosures in the British Isles. Swindon: English Heritage
 Payne A.  1996  "The Use of Magnetic Prospection in the Exploration of Iron Age Hillfort Interiors in Southern England". Archaeological Prospection, (3) 163–184

National Trust properties in Wiltshire
Sites of Special Scientific Interest in Wiltshire
Sites of Special Scientific Interest notified in 1975
Iron Age sites in England
Archaeological sites in Wiltshire
Scheduled monuments in Wiltshire